Ghost Beach was a New York-based live electronic music duo of Josh Ocean LaViolette (vocals, bass, synths) and Eric “Doc” Mendelsohn (guitars, synths, MPC sampler). Their sound was self-described as "Tropical Grit Pop” and was influenced by Peter Gabriel, The Police, The Talking Heads, and other popular music of the 1980s. The name Ghost Beach was taken from the popular children's book series Goosebumps.

The band's debut album, Blonde, was released on Nettwerk Records on March 4, 2014.  The album contains new material, as well as tracks from the band's self-released EPs. Blonde was produced by Nic Hard and Dave Weingarten. Blonde was mixed by Nic Hard.

Ghost Beach played at the South By Southwest Music Festival 2014. They have also performed with Imagine Dragons, David Guetta, Vampire Weekend, and Robin Thicke.

Artists Vs. Artists 

In March 2013, Ghost Beach employed a Times Square video billboard to publicly test philosophical questions of music piracy. For several weeks the billboard displayed the words "progress," "the future," "criminal," "a fad," "our generation," "harmless," freedom," "robbery" and "inevitable" under the words "Piracy is," and asked viewers to take a side by posting their opinions to social media using the hashtags #ArtistsForPiracy or #ArtistsAgainstPiracy.  A related website aggregated public opinion.
The campaign was carried out by TBWA\Chiat\Day in conjunction with American Eagle Outfitters, who paid for the use of the billboard.

Discography 

LPs
 Blonde (2014)

EPs
 Modern Tongues (2013)
 Modern Tongues Remixed (2013)
 Miracle (2013)

References 

Electronic music groups from New York (state)
Nettwerk Music Group artists